The Kawabata evaluation system (KES) is used to measure the mechanical properties of fabrics. The system was developed by a team led by Professor Kawabata in the department of polymer chemistry, Kyoto University Japan.

KES is composed of four different machines on which a total of six tests can be performed:
 Tensile & shear tester – tensile, shear
 Pure bending tester – pure bending
 Compression tester – compression
 Surface tester – surface friction and roughness

The evaluation can include measurement of the transient heat transfer properties associated with the sensation of coolness generated when fabrics contact the skin during wear. The KES not only predicts human response but understands the perception of softness.

External links 
 Discussion of Kawabata System at NC State U website

References 

Textiles